Gregory Jay Leon (born May 19th, 1958) is a Los Angeles hard rock guitarist notable for his stints in Quiet Riot and Dokken. He was also in a band called Suite 19 with Gary Holland, who was later replaced by Tommy Lee.

Leon is considered an influential and important musical personality in the Hollywood hard rock/heavy metal scene of the late 1970s and early 1980s, playing an integral part in the successive fortunes of the acts he was associated with.

Background 
Greg Leon was born in 1958 and grew up in Glendale, California, a foothills community of Los Angeles, and immediately made an impact on the blossoming live hard rock scene of Hollywood's Sunset Strip in the late 1970s. Primarily playing guitar and handling vocals, the acts that he fronted were Suite 19, with future Great White/Dokken drummer Gary Holland and then future Mötley Crüe drummer Tommy Lee, and the Greg Leon Invasion, with bassist Joey Vera (later of Armored Saint, Fate's Warning and Anthrax) and drummer Carl Elizondo (later of Jag Wire, and playing under the stage name Carl James). The Invasion would release the "Every Time" b/w "Stay With Me Tonite" 7" single with Vera on bass who was fired when it was discovered by Leon that he had been moonlighting with Armored Saint.  Vera's replacement, Chuck Stevenson and Elizondo played with Leon on the Greg Leon Invasion picture disc released by Azra/R2R in 1983. He took the place of Randy Rhoads in Quiet Riot, and as the pre-George Lynch guitarist in Dokken (Don Dokken has since made the group's first EP, which graces Leon on the cover, available for download to the public). During this period Leon also had a considerable local reputation as a guitar teacher, working at Rhoads' mother's guitar studio in Burbank.

Subsequent career 
Leon had several incarnations of the Invasion and played with various LA acts after his exciting early days. Leon also had a brief time with Greenworld Records' Midwestern act Vyper, while at the same time gathering a name for himself as a guitar amp modifying specialist. 
In the late 1990s, Leon fronted a band called Wishing Well which also featured Survivor drummer Marc Droubay and English-born bassist Stuart Brooks (ex-Black Cat Bones, Leaf Hound, The Pretty Things). The trio released their eponymous debut album in 1997. However, by 2003 Leon was once again playing the LA club scene under the name The Greg Leon Invasion, featuring Boston-born bassist George Roelke and Ohio-born drummer Greg Stevens, taking the group for a European festival tour in 2005 on the strength of new recordings, coupled with the myth related to his name. The line-up also performed July 13, 2007 at the annual 1980s-era hard rock music festival Rocklahoma. In 2008 former White Lion drummer Greg D'Angelo replaced Stevens in the band.

Leon is married to Canadian singer Suza Wood and in 2005 he produced her first album titled Sweet Freedom.

Discography

The Greg Leon Invasion
Greg Leon Invasion (1983)
Born to Die (1984)
Unfinished Business (2005)
Suza,"Sweet Freedom" 2005Guitars, Cars and Women (2010)
 Suza,"Love Warrior" 2016

Wishing WellWishing Well'' (1997)

References 

American heavy metal guitarists
Dokken members
Quiet Riot members
Living people
1958 births
Musicians from Glendale, California
Guitarists from Los Angeles
American male guitarists
20th-century American guitarists
20th-century American male musicians